Gavkan Rural District is a rural district (dehestan) in the Central District of Rigan County, Kerman Province, Iran. At the 2006 census, its population was 9,246, in 1,826 families. The rural district has 132 villages.

References 

Rural Districts of Kerman Province
Rigan County